Crusade is the fourth album and third studio album by the British blues rock band John Mayall & the Bluesbreakers, released on 1 September 1967 on Decca Records. It was the follow-up to A Hard Road, also released in 1967. As with their two previous albums, Crusade was produced by Mike Vernon. The album was the first recordings of the then-18-year-old guitarist Mick Taylor.

Track listing

Original release
All songs by John Mayall except as noted.

Expanded release

Other versions
An expanded edition includes ten more tracks, seven of them already available on the 1971 compilation Thru the Years, though Curly, an energetic guitar instrumental, is edited by more than a minute on Crusade. These recordings were made with earlier lineups, except two versions of "Suspicions", recorded later with a band similar to the Crusade lineup. A remastered and expanded version of this album was scheduled for release in the UK on 6 August 2007.

Personnel
John Mayall & the Bluesbreakers
 John Mayall – vocals, organ, piano, harmonica, bottleneck guitar
 Mick Taylor – lead guitar
 John McVie – bass guitar (except tracks 21–22)
 Keef Hartley – drums
with:
 Chris Mercer – tenor saxophone (except tracks 13–20)
 Rip Kant – baritone saxophone (except tracks 13–22)
 Peter Green – lead guitar (tracks 13–20)
 Aynsley Dunbar – drums (tracks 13–18)
 Mick Fleetwood – drums (tracks 19–20)
 Paul Williams – bass guitar (tracks 21–22)
 Dick Heckstall-Smith – tenor and soprano saxophone (tracks 21–22)

References

External links
 Official John Mayall website

1967 albums
John Mayall & the Bluesbreakers albums
Albums produced by Mike Vernon (record producer)
Decca Records albums
London Records albums